Delta Chi Xi Honorary Dance Fraternity, more commonly referred to as Delta Chi Xi, is a co-ed honorary professional fraternity and member of the Professional Fraternity Association organized to acknowledge academic excellence, serve the community, and share the art of dance among fellow students.

History  
The organization was established as an Honorary Dance Society by Kara J. Wade, Jennifer R. Cheek, and Kristina M. Rogers and was officially founded by Kara J. Wade and Jennifer R. Cheek under the advising of UNCG Dance Department Faculty member Robin Gee. 

Soon thereafter its model was transformed from an Honors Society into an Honors Fraternity and then became a Professional Fraternity. Delta Chi Xi was officially incorporated on October 20, 2011 by the North Carolina Secretary of State, Elaine Marshall. On  Delta Chi Xi was officially accepted into the Professional Fraternity Association, making it the first and only fraternity for collegiate dance students in the association.

Founders 
Delta Chi Xi was founded by: 
 Kara J. Wade
 Jennifer R. Cheek
 Kristina M. Rogers 

These women worked under the guidance of Robin Gee. The fourteen original charter members were Jennifer Cheek, Whitleigh Cook, Molly Derrickson, Lauren Drake, Rebekah Gonzalez, Joy Kelly, Andrea Lalley, Ann Brady Lewis, Margaret Moncure, Meredith Shaver, Carrie Simpson, Kristi Townsend, Kara Wade, and Ruth Ward.

Symbols 
Delta Chi Xi's colors are royal purple and teal. Purple is symbolic of royalty, power, nobility, and ambition; it is also associated with wisdom and creativity. Teal represents sophistication, uniqueness, guidance and leadership.

The official symbol of Delta Chi Xi is a combined sun and spiral to represent the unity and connection between dance, service, and academics. The sun is depicted by a silhouette of a dancer in a 'C jump' pose with 14 spirals as sun rays to represent the 14 original charter members.

Mission 
The official Statement of Purpose of Delta Chi Xi:

The official Mission Statement of Delta Chi Xi:

Delta Chi Xi hosts workshops, programs, and free dance classes for the community, and volunteers to assist any areas of need in the community. Delta Chi Xi's goals and purpose are organized into a Six POINTE Program:

Personal Health Awareness
Outreach & Service through Dance and Humanities
International Studies and Programs
Networking & Career Exploration
Technique & Professional Training
Education of the Arts

Organization 
Delta Chi Xi Honorary Dance Fraternity, Inc. has expanded to eight campus chapters, seven of which are active.

Chapters 
The following is a list of chapters of Delta Chi Xi. Active chapters are noted in bold, inactive chapters are noted in italics:

National board 
 Kara J. Wade, Founder & National Advisor
 Tarayjah Hoey-Gordon, National President
 Brianna Forbes, National Vice President and Secretary
 Adrienne de Prima, National House Representative and Treasurer
 Zack Fryman, National Public Relations Officer

National conference 
Delta Chi Xi hosts a national conference, DanCe fluX, every year at the University of Maryland. The conference includes master classes taught by guest artists, activities for fellowship among brothers of different chapters, and a dance concert.

 2015 College Park, MD
 2016 College Park, MD

Notable alumni
 Jeffrey Page, choreographer and dancer - awarded honorary membership in 2015
 Asiel Hardison, commercial dancer - awarded honorary membership in 2016

See also 

 Professional fraternities and sororities

References 

Art education organizations
Dance in North Carolina
Fraternities and sororities in the United States
Student organizations established in 2010
Organizations based in North Carolina
Professional fraternities and sororities in the United States
Service organizations based in the United States
Student societies in the United States
2010 establishments in North Carolina
Dance organizations
University of North Carolina at Greensboro
Professional Fraternity Association